FC Elektron Vyatskiye Polyany was a Russian football team from Vyatskiye Polyany. It played professionally from 1991 to 1997. Their best result was 11th place in the Zone 6 of the Russian Second Division in 1993.

External links
  Team history at KLISF

Association football clubs established in 1991
Association football clubs disestablished in 1998
Defunct football clubs in Russia
Sport in Kirov Oblast
1991 establishments in Russia
1998 disestablishments in Russia